Joseph Michel (25 October 1925 – 3 June 2016) was a Christian-Democrat Belgian politician, member of the PSC, who was President of the Belgian Chamber of Representatives (1980–81) and who twice served as Minister of the Interior.

Joseph Michel was born in Saint-Mard, Virton in 1925. In 1958 he was elected a member of the city council of Virton (1959–94), where he also served as alderman (1959–70) and mayor (1970–82). He became a member of the Belgian Chamber of Representatives in 1961 and served until 1991. He was the President of the  Chamber of Representatives from 1980–81. Michel was minister of the Interior (1974–77) in the first government of Leo Tindemans. During his term he put through a massive fusion operation in which the number of Belgian communes was lowered from 2.359 to 596. From 1977 to 1979 he was minister of French-language National Education. He later again served a second term as minister of the Interior (1986–88) under Wilfried Martens. On 3 June 2016 Michel died in Arlon aged 90.

References

External links 
 Joseph Michel in ODIS - Online Database for Intermediary Structures

1925 births
2016 deaths
Presidents of the Chamber of Representatives (Belgium)
Members of the Chamber of Representatives (Belgium)
Interior ministers of Belgium
Mayors of places in Belgium